Live Extracts is an album by Norwegian guitarist Eivind Aarset & The Sonic Codex Orchestra.

Review 
Aarset's fifth album as a leader embraces the improvisational power and skill of the expanded Sonic Codex Orchestra. All About Jazz critique John Kelman, in his review of Aarset's album Live Extracts states:
{| class="wikitable"
|-
|... «Live Extracts», culled from six different venues over the course of the past year. With minimal editing and no overdubs, this is as close to experiencing Aarset in performance as many will get, and for that reason alone is worthy of attention...
|}
Here the band offer live versions of tunes that differ markedly from recordings on previous studio albums, yet maintain the essential characteristics that are the hallmark of Aarset's music: controlled floating threads that bind together the strong melodies and abstract soundscapes, shaded, ominous atmospheres suffused with deep, subtle colours.

 Reception 
The BBC Music Magazine review awarded the album 5 stars for performance and 4 stars for sound, and The Guardian'' review awarded the album 3 stars.

Track listing 
«Electromoers» (2:16)
«Electromagnetic» (10:20)
«Still Changing» (7:54) Drums – Torstein Lofthus Saxophone – Håkon Kornstad
«Drøbak Saray» (9:43)
«Murky Seven» (2:06)
«Sign Of Seven	» (9:46)
«Blå Meis» (9:47) Saxophone – Håkon Kornstad

Personnel 
Bass – Audun Erlien
Drums, electronics & percussion – Wetle Holte
Drums & percussion – Erland Dahlen (tracks: 1, 2, 5 to 7)
Guitar & electronics – Eivind Aarset
Guitar & steel guitar (pedal steel) – Bjørn Charles Dreyer
Trumpet & synthesizer – Gunnar Halle (tracks: 1 to 3, 5, 6)

Credits 
Artwork – Stoffer Ganes
Engineer (Casa Del Jazz) – Johnny Skalleberg
Engineer (Domicil, Dortmund) – Johnny Skalleberg
Engineer (Jazzfestival Saalfelden) – Martin Leitner, Øystein Karlsen
Engineer (Moers Festival) – Geir Østenjø & Reiner Kúhl
Engineer & recording (Leipziger Jazztage) – Øystein Karlsen
Mastering – Bjørn Engelmann
Mixing – Ulf Holand
Photography – Oliver Heisch
Producer – Eivind Aarset
Producer (Jazzfestival Saalfelden) – Franz Ruedel
Producer (Moers Festival) – Bernd Hoffman
Recording (Casa Del Jazz) – Ascanio Cusella
Recording (Domicil, Dortmund) – Fred Bauer
Recording (Erland's Rehearsal Space) – Johnny Skalleberg
Supervision (Moers Festival) – Georg Nihuesmann
Technician (Casa Del Jazz) – Marcello Fagnani
Written by Erlien, Dreyer, Aarset, Dahlen, Halle, Holte

Notes 
Live recordings from:
Track 1,2,5 & 6: Moers Festival, Festivalzelt
Track 3: Jazzfestival Saalfelden and Domicil, Dortmund
Track 4: Leipziger Jazztage and Casa Del Jazz, Rome
Track 7: Erland's rehearsal space
Mixed at Lydlab, mastered at Cutting Room ℗ 2010 Eivind Aarset © 2010 Jazzland Recordings

References

External links 
Eivind Aarset - Live Extracts on Jazzland Recordings
Eivind Aarset Official Website

2007 live albums
Eivind Aarset albums